Coombell is a locality between the towns of Casino and Grafton in northern New South Wales, Australia. The North Coast railway passes through, and a railway station was provided between 1905 and 1974.

References

Towns in New South Wales
Northern Rivers
Richmond Valley Council